Her First Beau is a 1941 comedy-drama directed by Theodore Reed and starring Jane Withers and Jackie Cooper. The film was produced by Columbia Pictures, and the screenplay was written by Gladys Lehman and Karen DeWolf based on the 1939 play June Mad by Florence Ryerson and Colin Clements, which was adapted in turn from their 1930 novel This Awful Age.

Plot 
Fifteen-year-old Penelope "Penny" Woods dreams of being a writer, only she's concerned that she needs more life experience to work into her stories. She takes a liking to her uncle's friend Roger, a dashing but conceited college student who seems to have it all, and dreams of a big grown-up romance, but eventually his true colors are revealed. In the end, she realizes she'd rather spend time with her longtime friend Chuck, who's following his dream of being an aeronautical engineer.

Cast
 Jane Withers as Penny Wood
 Jackie Cooper as Chuck Harris
 Edith Fellows as Milly Lou
 Josephine Hutchinson as Mrs. Wood
 William Tracy as Mervyn Roberts
 Martha O'Driscoll as Julie Harris
 Edgar Buchanan as Elmer Tuttle
 Una O'Connor as Effie
 Jonathan Hale as Mr. Harris
 Kenneth Howell as Roger Van Vleck
 Addison Richards as Tom Wood

References

External links
 
 
 

1940s American films
1940s coming-of-age comedy-drama films
1940s English-language films
1941 films
1941 comedy-drama films
American black-and-white films
American comedy-drama films
American coming-of-age comedy-drama films
American films based on plays
American teen romance films
Columbia Pictures films
Films based on adaptations
Films directed by Theodore Reed
Films with screenplays by Florence Ryerson